John Sadler may refer to:

John Sadler, English merchant, co-founder of the Merchant's Hope plantation, Virginia, in 1638
John Sadler (town clerk) (1615–1674), English MP, lawyer, Town Clerk of London and Master of Magdalene College, Cambridge
John Sadler, English printer, inventor of transfer-printing in 1756
John Sadler (industrialist) (1820–1910), English industrialist and public servant associated with Oldbury, West Midlands
John W. Sadler (born 1956), American racehorse trainer
John Sadler (historian), British historian
John Sadler (cricketer) (born 1981), English cricketer